Richard E. Rench was a member of the Ohio House of Representatives from 1983 to 1992.

References

1941 births
Republican Party members of the Ohio House of Representatives
2008 deaths
20th-century American politicians